V. Mullaivendhan, also spelled V. Mullaiventhan, is a Dravida Munnetra Kazhagam (DMK) party politician from Indian state of Tamil Nadu. He was elected to the Tamil Nadu Legislative Assembly  from Morappur constituency in 1989, 1996 and 2006.

Mullaivendhan has served as minister of Information and Publicity from 1996. Later in 1998, he was allocated with additional subject Stationery and Printing and Government Press; subsequently he was re-designated as Minister for Information, Publicity and Printing. He was relieved as minister on 8th March 2001 and was succeeded by N. Suresh Rajan.

References 

Dravida Munnetra Kazhagam politicians
Living people
Year of birth missing (living people)
Tamil Nadu MLAs 1996–2001
Tamil Nadu MLAs 2006–2011
State cabinet ministers of Tamil Nadu